Señorita República Dominicana 1976 was held on February 23, 1976. There were 28 candidates who competed for the national crown. The winner represented the Dominican Republic at the Miss Universe 1976 . The Virreina al Miss Mundo will enter Miss World 1976. Only the 27 province, 1 municipality entered. On the top 10 they showed their evening gown and answered questions so they could go to the top 5. In the top 5 they would answer more questions.

Results

Señorita República Dominicana 1976 : Norma Eugenia Lora de Rosario del Río (Independencia)
Virreina al Miss Mundo : Jennyfer del Carmen Corporan Viñas (Santiago)
1st Runner Up : Jacqueline Hernández (La Altagracia)
2nd Runner Up : Carmen Reynosa (Dajabón)
3rd Runner Up : Rosa Alvarez (Santiago Rodríguez)

Top 10

Sandra Yañéz (Puerto Plata)
Cindy Zamora (Distrito Nacional)
María Tavarez (Santo Domingo de Guzmán)
Ana Lopez (Azua)
Auora Sánchez (Valverde)

Special awards
 Miss Rostro Bello – Rosa Alvarez (Santiago Rodríguez)
 Miss Photogenic (voted by press reporters) - Alba Costa (Séibo)
 Miss Congeniality (voted by Miss Dominican Republic Universe contestants) - Josefina Matos (San Pedro)
 Best Provincial Costume - Yajaira Caba (San Juan de la Maguana)

Delegates

 Azua - Ana María Lopez Zápote
 Baoruco - Guillermina Jodi Casenares Ceutá
 Barahona - Ivette Estefanía Prieto Malla
 Dajabón - Carmen Isaura Reynosa Fantino
 Distrito Nacional - Cindy María Zamora Brachet
 Duarte - Mary Joan Suarez Buenríos
 Espaillat - Angelica María Frutos Castro
 Independencia - Norma Eugenia Lora de Rosario del Río
 La Altagracia - Jacqueline Patricia Hernández Mateo
 La Estrelleta - Agnes Miguelina Brito Trujillo
 La Romana - Digna Piedad Belmonte Bracho
 La Vega - Ana Tatiana Rodríguez Bracamonte
 María Trinidad Sánchez - María Ana Mendoza Jaen
 Monte Cristi - Sofia Alegria Jacobo Vargas
 Pedernales - Isaura Iris Oviedo Campeche
 Peravia - Ana Josefina Aquino Hidalgo
 Puerto Plata - Ana Sandra Carolina Yañéz García
 Salcedo - Marianne Viviana Lambraco Bien
 Samaná -  Maira Rosa Lama Zaragoza
 Sánchez Ramírez - Rosa Yamilet Germán Cuello
 San Cristóbal -  Eva María Duarte Martínez
 San Juan de la Maguana - Yajaira Rosa Caba Ruiz
 San Pedro - María Josefina Matos Ramírez
 Santiago - Jennyfer del Carmen Corporan Viñas
 Santiago Rodríguez - Rosa María Alvarez Castañeda
 Séibo - Alba Josef Costa de Rodríguez
 Santo Domingo de Guzmán - Ana María Tavarez Ferro
 Valverde - Auora Yasica Sánchez Ramones

Miss Dominican Republic
1976 beauty pageants
1976 in the Dominican Republic
February 1976 events in North America